Tephrosia spinosa is a flowering plant species in the genus Tephrosia native from India, Sri Lanka, Malaysia and Indonesia.

Eupalitin 3-O-β-D-galactopyranoside, a glycoside of the flavonol eupalitin, can be isolated from T. spinosa. Tephrospinosin (3′,5′-diisopentenyl-2′,4′-dihydroxychalcone), a prenylated chalcone, can be isolated from the root.

References

External links 

spinosa
Plants described in 1807